Barbara Morton (born 17 June 1986 as Barbara McFarlane) is a Scottish curler and curling coach.

At the national level, she is a 2014 Scottish women's champion, a 2009 mixed champion and a 2007 junior champion.

Teams

Women's

Mixed

Record as a coach of national teams

References

External links

Video:

Living people
1986 births
Scottish female curlers
World curling champions
Scottish curling champions
Scottish curling coaches
Place of birth missing (living people)
World mixed curling champions